Cristanne Miller (born 1953) received her PhD in 1980 from the University of Chicago, and was for many years the W.M. Keck Distinguished Service Professor at Pomona College. Since 2006 she has taught at the University at Buffalo in New York, where she is SUNY Distinguished Professor and Edward H. Butler Professor of English. 

Miller established her reputation as a foremost scholar of Emily Dickinson with the publication in 1987 of Emily Dickinson: A Poet's Grammar.  David Porter praised Miller for showing "readers what is actually at stake in this idiosyncratic verse and maps better than anyone to date the links between the grammatical choices and literary identity." Tom Paulin's review in the London Review of Books concluded that Cristanne Miller's "densely researched study"  offered a "living and contemporary" reading of Dickinson's poems. "Miller works from the assumption that Dickinson sees herself 'oppositionally, defining her position in the world negatively, by distance from some social construct or law'. And Miller shows how those negations have a constructive role." Since 1987, Miller has published several other influential authored or edited books on Dickinson including Reading In Time: Dickinson in the Nineteenth Century (University of Massachusetts Press, 2012) and the monumental edition of Dickinson's poems, Emily Dickinson's Poems: As She Preserved Them (Harvard University Press, 2016). She is currently completing a new edition of Dickinson’s complete letters, co-edited with Domhnall Mitchell (Harvard University Press, scheduled for publication 2023).  

Miller has published equally extensively on Marianne Moore and modernist poetry, including essays or books on Moore, Mina Loy, Else Lasker-Schuler, Elizabeth Bishop, modernism in New York and Berlin, and gender and modernism. Emma Neale in the London Quarterly calls her 1996 Marianne Moore: Questions of Authority "An elegant tribute to a complex style...Gender, race, class and power are subjects which are used [by Miller] convincingly to unearth embedded references to several aspects of social control in the poetry itself." Celeste Goodridge in American Literature remarks that "the revisionary thrust of this book is important, timely, and a major contribution to Moore studies and the history of modernism." The Selected Letters of Marianne Moore (Knopf, 1997), which Miller co-edited with Bonnie Costello and Celeste Goodridge was listed by The New York Times as one of the notable books of 1997. On Miller's more recent Cultures of Modernism, Janet Lyon writes in Modernism/modernity that it "offers a welcome corrective to the unreflective critical tendency . . . to make broad claims about the historical experiences and cultural conundrums of 'women,' and particularly 'women writers.' Miller offers tour-de-force comparative readings . . . threading together the world-historical with the personal, poetics with the political, and wielding the instruments of scansion as deftly as a surgeon." In 2015, Miller founded the Marianne Moore Digital Archive http://moorearchive.org , which is publishing in digitized, transcribed, and annotated facing-page format all 122 of Moore’s working notebooks, including notebooks she kept for reading, conversation, poetry drafts, lectures, concerts, and finances, along with miscellaneous manuscripts, tools, and publications contextualizing the notebooks. Miller continues as director of this archive.

Miller’s grants and awards include an Alexander von Humboldt Foundation fellowship at the Free University of Berlin; awards from the Newberry Library, the National Endowment for the Humanities, and the American Council of Learned Societies; a Rothermere Institute of American Studies fellowship at Oxford University; and a Fulbright Tocqueville Distinguished Chair Award at the University of Paris 7 Diderot. Miller received the MLA Scholarly Edition Prize for her edition of Dickinson’s complete poems, Emily Dickinson’s Poems: As She Preserved Them (Harvard University Press, 2016); this edition has also been translated into Portuguese (trans: Adalberto Müller, Os Fascículos de Emily Dickinson, 2021). In 2017, she received the University of Buffalo President’s Medal for Excellence in Scholarship and Service.

Miller has served as Chair of the Department of English at both Pomona College (1996-97; 1998-2000; 2003-04) and the University at Buffalo SUNY (2006-2013; Interim chair 2015-2017), and has additionally served as editor of the Emily Dickinson Journal, as President of the Emily Dickinson International Society and of the Modernist Studies Association, and as Director of the Marianne Moore Digital Archive. She is currently Director of the Arts Management Program at the University at Buffalo (2019 - ), where she founded and currently co-directs the Digital Scholarship Studio & Network (2019 - ).

Selected publications
 Cristanne Miller, Emily Dickinson: A Poet's Grammar. Harvard University Press, 1987. [Chapter reprinted in New Century Views of Emily Dickinson, ed. Judith Farr; Prentice-Hall, 1996.]
 Cristanne Miller, Comic Power in Emily Dickinson.  Co-authored with Suzanne Juhasz and Martha Nell Smith.  University of Texas Press, 1993.
 The Women and Language Debate: A Sourcebook. Co-edited with Camille Roman and Suzanne Juhasz.  Rutgers University Press, 1994.  Online edition with netlibrary.com, 1999.
 Feminist Measures: Soundings in Poetry and Theory. Co-edited with Lynn Keller. University of Michigan Press, 1994.
 Cristanne Miller, Marianne Moore: Questions of Authority. Harvard University Press, 1995.
 Selected Letters of Marianne Moore. Co-edited with Bonnie Costello and Celeste Goodridge. Knopf, 1997.
 The Emily Dickinson Handbook. Co-edited with Roland Hagenbuchle and Gudrun Grabher. University of Massachusetts Press, 1998; second printing 2004.
 Cristanne Miller, Cultures of Modernism: Marianne Moore, Mina Loy, Else Lasker-Schuler. Gender and Literary Community in New York and Berlin. University of Michigan Press, 2005.
  'Words for the Hour': A New Anthology of American Civil War Poetry. Co-edited with Faith Barrett. University of Massachusetts Press, 2005.
 Critics and Poets on Marianne Moore: 'A right good salvo of barks'. Co-edited with Linda Leavell and Robin G. Schulze. Bucknell University Press, 2005.
 Cristanne Miller, "Gender and Sexuality in Modernist Poetry." Cambridge Companion to Modernist Poetry. Eds. Alex Davis and Lee Jenkins. Cambridge, UK: Cambridge University Press, 2007. 68-84.
 Cristanne Miller, "Tongues 'loosened in the melting pot': The Poets of Others and the Lower East Side." Modernism/Modernity 14.3 (Fall 2007): 455-476.
 Cristanne Miller, "Distrusting: Marianne Moore on Feeling and War in the 1940s." American Literature, 80.2 (2008): 353-379.
 Cristanne Miller, "Dickinson's Structured Rhythms," in A Companion to Emily Dickinson, ed. Martha Nell Smith and Mary Loeffelholz Blackwell Publishing, 2008, pp. 391–414.
 Cristanne Miller, "Drum-Taps—Revision and Reconciliation." Walt Whitman Quarterly 26.4 (Spring 2009): 171-96.
 Cristanne Miller, Reading In Time: Dickinson in the Nineteenth Century. University of Massachusetts Press, 2012.
Dickinson In Her Own Time: A Biographical Chronicle of Her Life, Drawn from Recollections, Memoirs, and Interviews by Friends and Associates. Co-edited with Jane Eberwein and Stephanie Farrar. University of Iowa Press, 2015.
 Cristanne Miller, ed. Emily Dickinson's Poems: As She Preserved Them. Harvard University Press, 2016.
Whitman & Dickinson: A Colloquy. Co-edited with Éric Athenot. University of Iowa Press, 2017.
Poetics and Precarity, in the series The Creeley Lectures on Poetry and Poetics. Co-edited with Myung Mi Kim. SUNY Press, 2018.

References

1953 births
Living people
University of Chicago alumni
University at Buffalo faculty
20th-century American non-fiction writers
21st-century American non-fiction writers
20th-century American women writers
21st-century American women writers
Pomona College faculty
American women academics